London Buses route 69 is a Transport for London contracted bus route in London, England. Running between Walthamstow Central and Canning Town stations, it is operated by Blue Triangle.

History

Introduced in February 1960 to replace Trolleybus route 669 Stratford to North Woolwich Ferry, Route 69 was extended in April 1960 from Stratford to Chingford Mount and, as part of London Transport's 'Reshaping' plan in 1968, further extended to Chingford Station. 

Upon the sale of London Buses' East London subsidiary in 1994, the route passed to Stagecoach, then operating between Walthamstow Central and North Woolwich.
 
Upon being re-tendered in 1999, it was retained by Stagecoach London with a new southern terminus, London City Airport. The North Woolwich section being covered by new route 474. The contract was again renewed, as a 24 hour sevice, commencing on 30 April 2004.

On 17 December 2005, it was curtailed from London City Airport to Canning Town station as part of a series of changes in connection with the Docklands Light Railway being extended. Stagecoach London commenced a further contract on 30 April 2011. In October 2015, three Alexander Dennis Enviro400 MMCs with inductive wireless charging technology, which allows its batteries to receive a charging boost when stationary at specially equipped bus stops entered service on route 69.

When next tendered, it was awarded to Tower Transit. The new contract commenced on 6 February.

In 2012, vandals damaged a bus by setting it on fire. The bus, Spirit of London, was a tribute to the victims of the 2005 London bombings. The police later arrested some teenagers. 

The route transferred from Tower Transit to Docklands Buses on 1 May 2021.

Current route
Route 69 operates via these primary locations:
Walthamstow Central station  
Baker's Arms 
Leyton Midland Road station 
Leyton station 
Maryland station  
Stratford bus station     
Plaistow station 
Canning Town station

References

External links

Bus routes in London
Transport in the London Borough of Newham
Transport in the London Borough of Waltham Forest